Zeballos Peak, formerly known as Zeballos Mountain, is a mountain on Vancouver Island, British Columbia, Canada, located  northeast of Zeballos and  northwest of Rugged Mountain.

See also
 List of mountains of Canada

References

Vancouver Island Ranges
One-thousanders of British Columbia
Rupert Land District